Congophiloscia annobonensis is a species of land crustacean isopods, in the family Philosciidae. The species was named by Helmut Schmalfuss and Franco Ferrara in 1978. The species is endemic to the island of Annobón in Equatorial Guinea.

References

Woodlice
Endemic fauna of Annobón
Invertebrates of Equatorial Guinea
Crustaceans described in 1978